Nijgh & Van Ditmar is a Dutch publishing company, founded in 1837. In 2014 it was acquired by Singel Uitgeverijen.

History
The company was founded in 1837 in Rotterdam by Henricus Nijgh, who originally started a bookstore but quickly discovered that the publishing business was profitable as well. Nijgh was also the founder, in 1843, of the Rotterdamsch staats-, handels-, nieuws- en advertentieblad, which later became the Nieuwe Rotterdamsche Courant. In 1864 he teamed up with Willem Nicolaas Josua van Ditmar, whose last name was added to the firm's name in 1870.

References

External links

1837 establishments in the Netherlands
Book publishing companies of the Netherlands
Companies established in 1837
Publishing companies established in 1837
Mass media in Rotterdam